Maanexit  (also spelled Manexit or Mayanexit) was a Nipmuc village on the Quinebaug River (Maanexit River) and Old Connecticut Path in Connecticut. The town was located near what is now Fabyan in Thompson, Connecticut and Woodstock, Connecticut. The name of the town means either "where the road lies" or "where we gather" which may have been "alluding to a settlement of Christian Indians in the immediate vicinity." The village became an Indian praying town through the influence of John Eliot and Daniel Gookin. 

Maanexit was located six miles north of Quinnatisset, another praying town, and Maanexit had about one hundred residents prior to King Philip's War. After King Philip's War Black James deeded some of the land making up the village to white settlers.

References

Aboriginal title in the United States
Assimilation of indigenous peoples of North America
Christianization
History of New England
King Philip's War
Native American Christianity
Native American history
Native American history of Connecticut